The Timavo River, known in Slovene as the  or , is a two-kilometre stream in the Province of Trieste.

Geography
The river has a karst character. It receives much of its water through subterranean flow from the Reka River (Slovenia), but tracer studies have shown that other sinking rivers, Vipava, Soča, and Raša also contribute. From modelling results, the Timavo is believed to receive one third of its flow from the Reka and two-thirds of its flow from infiltration of precipitation into the Karst Plateau, and to a lesser extent from the other sinking river sources.

History
The Roman authors Livy, Strabo, and Virgil mention the river. Virgil wrote that nine streams emerge from a mountain to form the river. A Roman settlement near the sources was called Fons Timavi. An Italian passenger liner called the Timavo ran aground during the Second World War on the east coast of South Africa near Cape Vidal. The engine of the wreck is still visible from the beach, now situated within the Isimangaliso Wetland Park.

Literature
In his 2019 work Underland, British author Robert Macfarlane tracks the source of the Timavo and discusses the history of its exploration.

References

References
Timava: skrivnostna reka, Massimo Gasparini; občina Devin Nabrežina, 2005 
Timavo: esplorazioni e studi, Trieste, Societa alpina delle Giulie, 1999 
Reka - Timav. Podobe, zgodovina in ekologija kraške reke, Ljubljana, Mladinska knjiga, 1990

External links 

Izviri Timave, spletna stran občine Devin-Nabrežina

Rivers of Friuli-Venezia Giulia
Karst springs
Province of Trieste
Rivers of Italy
Rivers of the Province of Gorizia
Adriatic Italian coast basins